Canlaon, officially the City of Canlaon , is a 4th class component city in the province of Negros Oriental, Philippines. According to the 2020 census, it has a population of 58,822 people.

The Banyan Tree (also known as the Century Tree; Balete Tree; Millennium Tree) inside the OISCA Farm is estimated by botanists from Silliman University to be around 1,300 years old. It is home to lizards, bats, and a variety of insects. It may be considered as Canlaon City's main tourist attraction.

History 
Canlaon was formerly a part of Vallehermoso as Sitio Mabigo of Barrio Panubigan. In 1941, Isidoro Bautista Sr., a geodetic engineer, along with its residents petitioned the Philippine government to convert Mabigo into a separate municipality.

World War II 
During the Second World War, the Japanese Imperial Army captured Canlaon City on April 10, 1942, right after the Battle of Bataan. The Japanese occupation of the city ended in early 1945 when soldiers from the Eighth United States Army under Lieutenant General Robert Eichelberger including the 40th Infantry Division (United States) and the 23rd Infantry Division (United States), landed in Negros Island to drive out the Japanese. On liberating Negros Island, they were assisted by newly formed Philippine Commonwealth Military Forces and local Negrense guerillas who helped in clearing out Japanese pockets of resistance throughout the island. In fact, the honor of liberating Canlaon City from the Japanese went to Philippine Commonwealth soldiers belonging to the 7th, 71st, 73rd and 75th Infantry Regiments of the Philippine Army, the 7th Constabulary Regiment of the Philippine Constabulary and Negrense guerillas.

Post-World War II

Creation as a municipality 
On October 11, 1946, President Manuel Roxas signed Executive Order no. 19, creating the municipality of Canlaon consists of two barrios (Mabigo and Panubigan) and nine sitios. It was inaugurated on January 1, 1947. Isidoro Bautista Sr. became its first municipal mayor.

Cityhood 

Lorenzo Teves, congressman of the first district of Negros Oriental, filed House Bill 4346, regarding the conversion of Canlaon into a city. The bill became Republic Act 3445. However, President Carlos P. Garcia did not signed the bill. It was only on April 20, 1967, when president Ferdinand Marcos signed Proclamation no. 193, making the municipality as a city. It took effect on July 2, 1967, making Canlaon as the 2nd city in the province.

Geography

Barangays

Canlaon is politically subdivided into 12 barangays.
 Bayog
 Binalbagan
 Bucalan
 Budlasan
 Linothangan
 Lumapao
 Mabigo (Poblacion)
 Malaiba
 Masulog
 Ninoy Aquino 
 Panubigan
 Pula

Climate

Demographics

Language

Cebuano is the main dialect of Canlaon City but Hiligaynon is also spoken as the city borders Negros Occidental. Tagalog and English are rather used as second languages.

Economy

References

External links

 [ Philippine Standard Geographic Code]
Philippine Census Information
Local Governance Performance Management System

Cities in Negros Oriental
Component cities in the Philippines
Establishments by Philippine executive order